Éric Andrieu (born 14 April 1960) is a French politician of the Socialist Party (PS) who has been as a Member of the European Parliament since 2012.

Political career
Andrieu entered the European Parliament when Kader Arif vacated his seat to join the government of Prime Minister Jean-Marc Ayrault. In parliament, he has been a member of the Committee on Agriculture and Rural Development (2012–2022) and the Committee on Development (since 2022). In 2018, he also served on the Special Committee on the Union's authorisation procedure for pesticides. He was also the parliament's rapporteur on the common organisation of agricultural markets (CMO) in 2020.

In addition to his committee assignments, Andrieu is part of the European Parliament Intergroup on Seas, Rivers, Islands and Coastal Areas and of the European Parliament Intergroup on the Welfare and Conservation of Animals.

From the 2019 elections until 2021, Andrieu served as vice-chair of the S&D Group, under the leadership of chairwoman Iratxe García.

Ahead of the 2022 presidential elections, Andrieu publicly declared his support for Anne Hidalgo as the Socialists’ candidate and joined her campaign team.

Political positions
In May 2021, Andrieu joined a group of 39 mostly Green Party lawmakers from the European Parliament who in a letter urged the leaders of Germany, France and Italy not to support Arctic LNG 2, a $21 billion Russian Arctic liquefied natural gas (LNG) project, due to climate change concerns.

References

MEPs for France 2009–2014
MEPs for South-West France 2014–2019
MEPs for France 2019–2024
Socialist Party (France) MEPs
1960 births
Living people